Sapromyza neozelandica, commonly called the brown striped litter fly, is an endemic fly of New Zealand.

A small red-eyed fly that lives in forest or areas of scrub usually in damp and shaded places. S. neozelandica maggots live amongst leaf litter and feed off moulds.

References

External links

 Citizen science observations

Diptera of New Zealand
Lauxaniidae
Endemic fauna of New Zealand
Insects described in 1926
Endemic insects of New Zealand